The 2015–16 season was Dundee's second season in the Scottish Premiership, having been promoted from the Scottish Championship at the end of the 2013/14 season. Dundee also competed in the League Cup and the Scottish Cup.

Results and fixtures

Scottish Premiership

Scottish League Cup

Scottish Cup

Squad statistics
During the 2015–16 season, Dundee have used twenty-six different players in competitive games.

Disciplinary record

Team statistics

League table

Division summary

Management statistics
Last updated on 14 May 2016

Transfers

Players in

Players out

See also
 List of Dundee F.C. seasons

Notes

References

Dundee F.C. seasons
Dundee